United Naga Democratic Party (UNDP) is a regional political party in Nagaland, India.

Political parties in Nagaland
Political parties with year of establishment missing